Musbury is a village and civil parish in the East Devon district of Devon, England. Musbury is served by the A358 road and lies on the route of the East Devon Way, a  footpath following the Axe Valley. The village is within the East Devon Area of Natural Beauty. It has a post office, primary school, public house, fuel station and church. The parish population at the 2011 census was 543.

History
The village takes its name from the Iron Age hill fort of Musbury Castle on the hill above it, from which there are  views of the Axe Valley. The parish church, which is dedicated to St. Michael, is a 15th-century structure that was much rebuilt and restored by the Victorians. It contains the Drake Memorial dating from 1611. A portrait of the village in 1940 appears in the final chapter of Cecil Day-Lewis's memoir The Buried Day.

Historic estates
Ash, for many generations the seat of the Drake family. It was the birthplace of John Churchill, 1st Duke of Marlborough (1650-1722) whose mother was Elizabeth Drake.

References

External links

Musbury Primary School

Villages in Devon